Ceratophyllus niger, also known as the western chicken flea or the black hen flea, is an ectoparasite of birds. It is a member of the family Ceratophyllidae and was described by Fox in 1908.

References 

Ceratophyllidae
Insects described in 1908
Ectoparasites
Parasites of birds